Chaz Pictro Mulkey (born February 4, 1981) is an American Muay Thai kickboxer who competes in the middleweight and super middleweight divisions. He defeated Remy Bonnel to win the WBC Muaythai International Middleweight (-72 kg/160 lb) Championship in 2011.

Career
Mulkey began practicing Muay Thai in his 20s under Saekson Janjira at Janjira Muay Thai in Dallas, Texas. After training there for six months, he moved to Las Vegas, Nevada. He turned professional in 2009 after an undefeated amateur career.

On August 28, 2010, Mulkey lost via unanimous decision to Remy Bonnel in Primm, Nevada. He then lost to Joe Schilling by second round technical knockout in Los Angeles, California on December 5, 2012 in a WBC Muaythai US Super Muddleweight (-76 kg/168 lb) title eliminator.

He snapped a two-fight losing streak by defeating Douglas Edwards by TKO in round two in a rematch in Primm, Nevada on February 12, 2011. This was followed up with two back-to-back wins in the space of a month in May 2011 when he beat Ken Tran by unanimous decision in Primm and Phillip Sidkrunoom by TKO due to low kicks in Thailand.

This earned him a shot at the WBC Muaythai International Middleweight (-72 kg/160 lb) Championship against familiar opponent Remy Bonnel on August 20, 2011. After a close fight, Mulkey was decided the victor by split decision to become the new champion. He made the first defence of his title against Simon Chu in Las Vegas on November 19, 2011, taking a unanimous decision over the Englishman.

He then went up against Gregory Choplin in Las Vegas on May 14, 2012. Choplin floored Mulkey and utilised powerful low kicks en route to a unanimous decision which ended Mulkey's five-fight win-streak.

He was slated to face Saiyok Pumpanmuang at Thai Fight: Pattaya in Pattaya, Thailand on April 17, 2012 but instead faced Bernueng TopKing Boxing and lost a decision after three rounds.

In March 2012, it was reported that Mulkey had signed with Glory, one of the world's premier kickboxing organizations, to compete in the 2012 Middleweight Slam tournament. He was replaced by Michael Chase Corley, however, as America's second representative alongside Ky Hollenbeck. He joined K-1 instead and debuted against Kit Cope at the K-1 World Grand Prix 2012 in Los Angeles on September 8, 2012. Cope injured himself while attempting a spinning kick in round two, and Mulkey was able to knock him down three time by attacking his injured leg, which caused the referee to stop the bout and announce Mulkey as the winner by TKO.

Championships and awards

Kickboxing
World Boxing Council Muaythai
WBC Muaythai International Middleweight (-72 kg/160 lb) Championship

Kickboxing record

|-  bgcolor="#CCFFCC"
| 2012-09-08 || Win ||align=left| Kit Cope || K-1 World Grand Prix 2012 in Los Angeles || Los Angeles, California, US || TKO (referee stoppage) || 2 || 2:16 || 9-6
|-
|-  bgcolor="#FFBBBB"
| 2012-04-17 || Loss ||align=left| Bernueng TopKing Boxing || Thai Fight: Pattaya || Pattaya, Thailand || Decision || 3 || 5:00 || 8-6
|-
|-  bgcolor="#FFBBBB"
| 2012-05-14 || Loss ||align=left| Gregory Choplin || Battle in the Desert 5 || Las Vegas, Nevada, US || Decision (unanimous) || 5 || 5:00 || 8-5
|-
|-  bgcolor="#CCFFCC"
| 2011-11-19 || Win ||align=left| Simon Chu || Battle in the Desert 4 || Las Vegas, Nevada, US || Decision (unanimous) || 5 || 3:00 || 8-4
|-
! style=background:white colspan=9 |
|-
|-  bgcolor="#CCFFCC"
| 2011-08-20 || Win ||align=left| Remy Bonnel || Battle in the Desert 3 || Primm, Nevada, US || Decision (split) || 5 || 3:00 || 7-4
|-
! style=background:white colspan=9 |
|-
|-  bgcolor="#CCFFCC"
| 2011-05-00 || Win ||align=left| Phillip Sidkrunoom || || Thailand || TKO (low kicks) || 2 || || 6-4
|-
|-  bgcolor="#CCFFCC"
| 2011-05-14 || Win ||align=left| Ken Tran || Battle in the Desert 2 || Primm, Nevada, US || Decision (unanimous) || 5 || 3:00 || 5-4
|-
|-  bgcolor="#CCFFCC"
| 2011-02-12 || Win ||align=left| Douglas Edwards || Battle in the Desert 1 || Primm, Nevada, US || TKO (knee) || 2 || 2:41 || 4-4
|-
|-  bgcolor="#FFBBBB"
| 2010-12-05 || Loss ||align=left| Joe Schilling || The Kings Birthday Celebration || Los Angeles, California, US || TKO (referee stoppage) || 2 || 1:06 || 3-4
|-
|-  bgcolor="#FFBBBB"
| 2010-08-28 || Loss ||align=left| Remy Bonnel || WCK Muay Thai || Primm, Nevada, US || Decision (unanimous) || 5 || 3:00 || 3-3
|-
|-  bgcolor="#CCFFCC"
| 2010-04-30 || Win ||align=left| Menno Dijkstra || WCK Muay Thai || Primm, Nevada, US || Decision (unanimous) || 5 || 3:00 || 3-2
|-
|-  bgcolor="#CCFFCC"
| 2009-12-05 || Win ||align=left| Bryce Krauss || WCK Muay Thai || Las Vegas, Nevada, US || KO || 1 || 1:07 || 2-2
|-
|-  bgcolor="#FFBBBB"
| 2009-08-30 || Loss ||align=left| Chike Lindsay || || Las Vegas, Nevada, US || Decision (majority) || 5 || 3:00 || 1-2
|-
|-  bgcolor="#FFBBBB"
| 2009-06-13 || Loss ||align=left| Marfio Canoletti || War of the Heroes III || Santa Clara, California, US || TKO (cut) || 5 || 0:52 || 1-1
|-
|-  bgcolor="#CCFFCC"
| || Win ||align=left| Douglas Edwards || || || || || || 1-0
|-
| colspan=9 | Legend:

References

External links
 Official K-1 profile

Living people
1981 births
American male kickboxers
Kickboxers from Texas
Middleweight kickboxers
American Muay Thai practitioners
People from Dallas